Ballito is an affluent town located in KwaZulu-Natal, South Africa. It forms part of the KwaDukuza Local Municipality, and iLembe District Municipality. Dolphins are common on this stretch of the North Coast shoreline, hence the nickname Dolphin Coast.

History
The town was established in 1954 as a private township, by the Glen Anil Development Corporation/Investments which was headed up by Dr Edward (Eddie) Rubenstein (1903–1972). The town's name was borrowed from a glossy advert for Ballito hosiery made by Ballito Hosiery Limited of St. Albans, England. The area was originally portion of a sugar cane farm at Compensation Beach owned by Basil Townsend.

The Sunday Tribune printed in 1954 an advert for Ballito Bay inviting potential investors to the North Coast with prices of land from R790.00 (395 SA Pounds). By 1964 the zonings for Ballitoville's residential buildings, hotels and a caravan park had already been incorporated into the town plan known as Compensation Beach and this area stretched out from Willard Beach to Clark Bay, Salmon Bay and Port Zimbali. A brochure with the first marketing pictures of Ballito, was put out to attract the holiday makers to invest in the area with the slogan: "Buy, Build & Play at Ballito Bay, The Caribbean of the North Coast – Natal". Ballito, Salt Rock and Shaka's Rock are favourite holiday destinations for local South Africans and also foreign tourists on their way to Zululand and the historical battlefields.

Jack Nash (1914–2016) gives a personal history from the early beginning of Ballito through to 1986 when he left the area and includes a history of some of the early pioneers and characters of the town. These include his father-in-law, Reg Fripp, who built many of the early houses. Jack Nash, who lived until shortly before his death in Amber Valley, Howick, own history includes being the Estate Agent for Glen Anil in Ballito through to him being the Chairman of the Ballito and the North Coast Publicity Associations. Jack's wife Gaye Nash née Fripp, the young ballet dancer holding the "little ball" or ballito above her head in the full page press release to publicise the then new township in the Sunday Tribune of 23 November 1954, still lives in Howick.

Geography 
Ballito is located on a series of hills overlooking the Indian Ocean with the altitude rising from the coastline to the Ballito Central Business District (CBD) and Umhlali Country Club. 

Ballito is located about 24 km south-east of KwaDukuza (formerly Stanger) and 40 km north-east of Durban and is situated between Shaka’s Rock and Simbithi Eco Estate to the north and Zimbali Coastal Estate/Port Zimbali to the south.

Communities

The Greater Ballito area includes 7 smaller communities alongside Ballito proper (the main town) which is bordered by the N2 highway to the west. These smaller communities include:

 Caledon Estate is a gated residential estate located north-west of Ballito and south of the railway (North Coast Line) and Shaka’s Head. 
 Port Zimbali Estate is an affluent estate located south-west of Ballito and west of the Zimbali Coastal Estate and is the largest component of Greater Zimbali. It also consists of the Zimbali Country Club which it shares with Zimbali Coastal Estate. 
 Shaka’s Head is a township located north-west of Ballito and bordered by Salt Rock Road to the north-east, the R102 to the north-west, the railway to the south and Ballito Drive in the south-west. It is also the furthest suburb of the Greater Ballito area. 
 Shaka’s Rock is a small seaside village which is located north of Ballito.
 Simbithi Eco Estate is an affluent eco residential estate with a country club located north-west of Ballito and above (west of) Shaka’s Rock.
 Umhlali Golf and Country Estate is an affluent residential estate consisting of the Umhlali Country Club and is located north-west of Ballito.
 Zimbali Coastal Estate or just Zimbali Estate is an affluent coastal forest estate located south of Ballito and east of Port Zimbali and consists of the Zimbali Country Club.
Ballito, Shaka’s Rock, Simbithi Eco Estate, Port Zimbali and Zimbali Coastal Estate are located east of the N2 highway whilst Caledon Estate, Shaka’s Head and Umhlali Golf and Country Eatate are located west of the N2 highway and east of the R102. 

The Greater Ballito area also extends beyond its administrative boundaries to include the nearby settlements of Salt Rock, Sheffield Beach, Brettenwood Coastal Estate, Tinley Manor Beach, uMhlali and Shakaskraal.

Infrastructure

Healthcare 
Ballito only has one hospital, Netcare Alberlito Hospital which is a private hospital near the town centre owned by one of South Africa's largest healthcare groups, Netcare. Ballito does have one public health facility in the town which is a public clinic near the town centre whilst the nearest public hospital is the General Justice Gizenga Mpanza Regional Hospital in KwaDukuza.

Transport 

Ballito is mainly accessed by the major N2 highway which is the only freeway that passes Ballito. The N2 borders Ballito to the west and links the town to KwaDukuza in the north-east and oThongathi and Durban in the south-west. Access to Ballito from the N2 can be obtained mainly through the M4 Ballito Drive interchange (Exit 210) and within the Greater Ballito area, access from the N2 can be obtained through the Shaka’s Rock interchange (Exit 212) and Salt Rock interchange (Exit 214) to the north of Ballito. 

The M4 (Ballito Drive) is the main arterial route through Ballito and a metropolitan route that links the coastal town to uMhlanga and Durban to the south-west as well as the N2 highway, Compensation and the R102 to the west. The M4 can also be used an alternative route to eMdloti, uMhlanga and Durban for motorists avoiding the tolled N2 highway and especially the oThongathi Toll Plaza.  

The R102 is a regional route that runs towards the outer west outskirts of Ballito and links the town to oThongathi, Verulam and Durban in the south-west and Shakaskraal and KwaDukuza in the north-west. The R102 can also be used an alternative route to KwaDukuza for motorists avoiding the tolled N2 highway and especially the Mvoti Toll Plaza.  

Smaller secondary routes within Greater Ballito include ‘Ballito Drive’ (excluding the M4 section) linking the Central Business District (CBD) to the coastline below, ‘Shaka’s Rock Road’ linking Shaka’s Head and the nearby industrial estate to Simbithi Eco Estate and Shaka’s Rock and ‘Salt Rock Road’ linking uMhlali to Salt Rock.

Tourism
Today Ballito is a thriving community of its own with ties to primary and high schools in and around Ballito, uMhlanga, KwaDukuza and oThongathi. Ballito has grown exponentially in recent times and has two shopping malls, Lifestyle centre and The Junction. Fantastic family adventure attractions such as the crocodile farm and microlight flights and tours. It is a holiday destination with hotels and self-catering accommodation, swimming (Willard) and surfing beaches (Boulder). The Gunston 500 surfing contest, renamed  Ballito Pro sponsored by Billabong, has been shifted from the Bay of Plenty in Durban's Golden Mile to Ballito where it is held annually in July.

Economy

Business sector
Ballito's business sector has also grown significantly with a large commercial business park bordering the N2 freeway. With a full service industry within the commercial business park, Ballito now caters to a growing business community on the North Coast. Enterprise iLembe, the region's investment arm, has been formed to develop Ballito and the iLembe area as an investment destination of choice. The development of the King Shaka International Airport and Dube TradePort to the south have also contributed significantly to the growth of Ballito.

Retail
Ballito has grown to become the largest retail node on the KwaZulu-Natal North Coast with a large concentration of shopping centres, motor delearships and other retail facilities. The shopping centres in Ballito, including Salt Rock include: 

Ballito Junction Regional Mall, the second largest shopping centre north of Durban (after Gateway Theatre of Shopping in uMhlanga) is located on Ballito Drive in the CBD.
Ballito Lifestyle Centre, a lifestyle oriented shopping centre located adjacent Ballito Junction, along Ballito Drive in the CBD.
New Salt Rock Shopping Centre, a small and newly developed shopping centre located on the corner between Salt Rock Road and New Salt Rock Drive in the New Salt Rock City precinct. 
Tiffany’s Shopping Centre, a small shopping centre in Salt Rock on the corner between the N2 interchange and Salt Rock Road with Kwikspar as the anchor tenant.

Growth
In recent years, there has been a population boom in Ballito. Various secure or gated estates, the largest being Zimbali Coastal Resort and Estate followed by Simbithi, have been built in and around the town on land that was previously used as sugar cane farms. Many new hotels and resorts have opened, drawing even more tourists into this picturesque part of the KwaZulu-Natal coast. Plans are currently on the table for new schools to be constructed, a new town centre, a taxi rank, and a larger clinic. The main entrance to Ballito from the N2 highway has been upgraded, with the construction of an multi level interchange to ease traffic, the widening of the road to four lanes in Ballito Drive, and proper pedestrian walkways.

References

External links
Zimbali Coastal Resort & Estate

Populated places in the KwaDukuza Local Municipality
1954 establishments in South Africa